Romeo and Juliet is a tragedy by William Shakespeare.

Romeo and Juliet or Romeo & Juliet may also refer to:

Ballets
 Romeo and Juliet (Prokofiev), a 1935 ballet score by Sergei Prokofiev and choreographed by Leonid Lavrovsky and with Konstantin Sergeyev in 1940
 Romeo and Juliet, a 1955 ballet by Frederick Ashton
 Romeo and Juliet (Cranko), a 1962 ballet by John Cranko
 Romeo and Juliet (MacMillan), a 1965 ballet by Kenneth MacMillan
 Romeo and Juliet (Neumeier), a 1971 ballet by John Neumeier
 Romeo and Juliet (Nureyev), a 1977 ballet by Rudolf Nureyev
 Romeo and Juliet, a 1979 ballet by Yuri Grigorovich
 Romeo and Juliet (Lavery), a 1991 setting of the balcony scene by Sean Lavery
 Roméo et Juliette, a 1996 ballet by Jean-Christophe Maillot
 Romeo + Juliet (ballet) (or Romeo † Juliet), a 2007 ballet by Peter Martins
 Romeo and Juliet (Pastor), a 2008 ballet by Krzysztof Pastor
 Romeo and Juliet, a ballet score by Constant Lambert

Film

 Films titled Romeo and Juliet
 Romeo and Juliet (1900 film)
 Romeo and Juliet (1908 film)
 Romeo and Juliet (1916 Metro Pictures film)
 Romeo and Juliet (1916 Fox film)
 Romeo and Juliet (1936 film)
 Romeo and Juliet (1940 film)
 Romeo and Juliet (1954 Argentine film)
 Romeo and Juliet (1954 film)
 Romeo and Juliet (1955 film), a ballet film based on Lavrovsky's choreography
 Romeo and Juliet (1968 film), directed by Franco Zeffirelli
 The Tragedy of Romeo and Juliet (film), a 1982 film
 Romeo.Juliet, 1990 film
 Romeo and Juliet in Sarajevo, a 1994 documentary film about the deaths of Admira Ismić and Boško Brkić
 Romeo + Juliet, 1996 film
 Tromeo and Juliet, a 1997 film
 Romeo & Juliet: Sealed with a Kiss, 2006 animated feature film
 Gnomeo & Juliet, a 2011 film
 Romeo & Juliet (2013 film)
 Romeo Juliet (2015 film), a Tamil romantic comedy film
 Romeo Juliet (2017 film)

Television
 BBC Television Shakespeare Season One – "Romeo & Juliet" (1978)
 Romeo y Julieta (TV series), a 2007 Argentina soap opera
 Romeo × Juliet, a 2007 anime television series by Gonzo

Music
 Romeo and Juliet, incidental music by Anna Schuppe (1829-1903)
 Roméo et Juliette (Berlioz), a 1839 choral symphony by Hector Berlioz
 Romeo and Juliet (Tchaikovsky), a fantasy-overture by Pyotr Ilyich Tchaikovsky
 Romeo and Juliet (Prokofiev), a 1935 ballet score by Sergei Prokofiev, which was later compiled into three suites

Albums
 Romeo and Juliet (album), a 1977 album by Alec R. Costandinos and the Syncophonic Orchestra
 Romeo + Juliet (soundtrack), a soundtrack album to the 1996 film

Songs
 "(Just Like) Romeo and Juliet", a 1964 hit single by blue-eyed soul/doo-wop group The Reflections
 "Romeo & Juliet", a 1967 cover of the Reflections song, by Michael and the Messengers
 Love Theme from Romeo and Juliet, the main theme written by Johnny Mercer and Henry Mancini from the 1968 film Romeo and Juliet
 "Romeo and Juliet" (Alec R. Costandinos song), a 1978 disco hit by Alec R. Costandinos and the Syncophonic Orchestra
 "Romeo and Juliet" (Blue System song), a 1992 song by the German band Blue System
 "Romeo and Juliet" (Dire Straits song), a 1981 song by the British rock band Dire Straits
 "Romeo Had Juliette", a song by Lou Reed from his 1989 album New York
 "Romeo and Juliet", a 1992 song by the German synthpop band Blue System
 "Romeo and Juliet", a song from the 1992 album Black Moon by Emerson, Lake, & Palmer
 "Romeo ja Julia", a 1995 song by the Finnish eurodance and pop band Movetron
 "Romeo and Juliet" (Sylk-E. Fyne song), a 1998 song by American rapper, Sylk-E. Fyne
 "Romeo & Juliet", a 2010 song by Hey! Say! JUMP
 "Romeo & Juliet", a 2017 song by American rapper Trippie Redd from the mixtape A Love Letter to You
 "Juliet & Romeo", a 2019 song by Martin Solveig and Roy Woods

Operas and musicals
 Romeo und Julie, a 1776 opera by Georg Benda
 Giulietta e Romeo, a 1796 opera by Niccolò Antonio Zingarelli
 Giulietta e Romeo (Vaccai), an 1825 opera by Nicola Vaccai
 I Capuleti e i Montecchi, an 1830 opera by Vincenzo Bellini 
 Roméo et Juliette, an 1867 opera by Charles Gounod
 A Village Romeo and Juliet, a 1907 opera by Frederick Delius
 Romeo und Julia, a 1940 opera by Heinrich Sutermeister
Romeo und Julia (Blacher opera), a 1943 opera by Boris Blacher
 Roméo et Juliette, de la Haine à l'Amour, a 2001 musical by Gérard Presgurvic
 Giulietta e Romeo (musical), a 2007 musical by Riccardo Cocciante and Pasquale Panella
 Romeo & Julia (Estonian musical), Estonian musical

Tobacco
 Romeo y Julieta (cigar), a Cuban and a Dominican cigar brand
 Romeo y Julieta (cigarette), a Cuban cigarette brand

Miscellaneous
 The Tragical History of Romeus and Juliet, 1562 Arthur Brooke poem, Shakespeare's source
 Romiette and Julio, a 2001 Sharon Draper young adult novel
 Romeo and Juliet laws, an unofficial name for some statutory rape laws

See also

 Romeo and Juliet on screen
 Juliet (disambiguation)
 Juliet Capulet
 Romeo (disambiguation)
 Romeo Montague